Perils of the Deep Blue is the sixth studio album by the Norwegian gothic metal band Sirenia. It was released on June 28, 2013, in Europe, July 1 in the United Kingdom and July 9 in North America by Nuclear Blast.

Produced by Morten Veland, it was mastered and mixed by Endre Kirkesola at Dub Studios in Norway.

It was the band's last album released by Nuclear Blast, before the expiration of their long-term contract.

Cover art 
The album cover art represents a fortuitous event. It was created by the British Gothic artist Anne Stokes. Veland found the sinister painting, titled "Siren's Lament" - a depiction of a reclining siren upon a rock in a sea cave, sliding her tail through the skulls of her (apparent) victims, as they float on the water surface - when he surfed the Internet looking for a suitable illustration for the album. He contacted Stokes, who is well known internationally for her fantasy art. She gave him permission to use it on the then unreleased album.

In the following releases, Veland chose to request much more complex, dark and tailored covers, created by the Hungarian artist Gyula Havancsák.

Writing and recording
Ailyn joined a Norwegian choir in 2012 to for some training and for inspiration for the upcoming release. According to Morten, the writing process took two years. He began writing for the album before the release of the previous one. In an interview, he said, "The entire band and all the people we are working with are absolutely ecstatic about it! This album takes SIRENIA to the next level and brings many new sides of us to the table. There's typical tried and tested SIRENIA stuff but also approaches that you've never heard from us before. I think I've never felt so good about an album throughout my entire career. I mean, I love them all, but this one is something special. It's the result of two and a half years of blood, sweat and tears. I've literally put my heart and soul into this record, so I am very curious to see what our fans as well as the press will think about it!"

Promotion
On May 7, 2013, Sirenia released a studio trailer for the album on Facebook. On May 10, the band released a download single, "Seven Widows Weep", through Amazon along with "Ditt Endelikt".

The band released its second studio trailer showing the members' photo shoot for the album on May 21, 2013, on Nuclear Blast'''s YouTube channel.

On June 3, Sirenia premiered their latest music video for their single "Seven Widows Weep". It was filmed in April in Serbia by iCODE Team Productions.

A final release, of the song "Once A Star", was available from June 2013 for digital download only from iTunes.

 Reception Perils of the Deep Blue was Sirenia's greatest commercial success to date.  It was their first entry into the US charts: the Billboard's Hard Rock Albums (No. 97) and Heatseekers Albums - which lists the best-selling albums by artists who have never appeared in the Top 100 of the Billboard 200 - where it peaked at No. 20. Overall, it sold about 900 copies in the United States in its first week of release. By the end of that year, it had sold 1,560 copies.

Similarly, in Europe the release was quite important. It was Sirenia's first entry to the UK Rock Chart, where it peaked at No. 11.

Track listing

 "Seven Widows Weep" has a video''.

Personnel

Sirenia
Morten Veland – vocals, all other instruments
Ailyn – vocals

Session musicians
Joakim Næss – clean male vocals on "Ditt endelikt"
Damien Surian, Mathieu Landry, Emmanuelle Zoldan and Emilie Bernou – The Sirenian Choir

Additional notes
Spanish translations on "Ditt endelikt" by Ailyn and Pilar García Ruiz
"Perils of the Deep Blue" was recorded in Audio Avenue Studios (Tau, Norway), additional recordings of choirs and some acoustic guitars were recorded in Sound Suite Studios in Marseille, France
Written, composed, arranged, produced and engineered by Morten Veland
Pre-produced in Audio Avenue Studios in Tau, Norway
Mixed and mastered by Endre Kirkesola at dUb studio in Oslo, Norway
A+R by Jaap Waagemaker
Cover artwork by Anne Stokes
Design and layout by Wendy van den Bogert
Band photos by Fotograf Tom Knudsen

Charts

References

External links
 The review of the album.
 Metallum Archives

2013 albums
Sirenia (band) albums
Nuclear Blast albums